Dalu Zahra (also Romanized as Dālū Zahrā and Delū Zahrā) is a village in Howmeh-ye Sharqi Rural District, in the Central District of Izeh County, Khuzestan Province, Iran. At the 2006 census, its population was 106, in 20 families.

References 

Populated places in Izeh County